Goldsikka ATM is an automated teller machine in Hyderabad which is India's first  and the world's first real time gold ATM.

History 
It was launched by Goldsikka Pvt. Ltd. with the collaboration of OpenCube Technologies Pvt. Ltd. in 3 December 2022 at Ashoka Raghupathi Chambers, Begumpet. It was inaugurated by Vakiti Sunitha Laxma Reddy, Chairperson of Telangana Women's Commission.

Functions 
It can dispense gold coins ranging from 0.5 grams to 100 grams. In the machine, people can use credit or debit card. It gives 24/7 service to their customers and also gives the live price of gold. The gold will be of 24 carat and can store 5 kg gold. It gives pure and hallmarked gold coins. Its price is updated from the London bullion market. Its coins are dispersed in packs which are tamper proof and certified with 999 purity. The ATM will return money to bank if there will be any failed transaction.

References 

Automated teller machines
Computer-related introductions in 2022